Trifolium gracilentum is a species of clover known by the common names pinpoint clover and slender clover. It is native to western North America including the west coast of the United States and northwestern Mexico, where it grows in many types of habitat, including disturbed areas. It is an annual herb growing prostrate to erect in form with mostly hairless or slightly hairy herbage. The leaves are made up of lance-shaped to oval leaflets. The inflorescence is an umbel of flowers that spread out or flex downward. The flowers have pink or purple corollas less than a centimeter long.

One variety of this species, var. palmeri, is a rare plant limited to the Channel Islands of California; it is sometimes treated as a species in its own right, Trifolium palmeri.

Subspecies
Trifolium gracilentum used to be classified with two varieties:
Trifolium gracilentum var. gracilentum
Trifolium gracilentum var. palmeri

References

External links
Calflora Database: Trifolium gracilentum  (Graceful clover,  Pin point clover, Pinpoint clover)
Jepson Manual eFlora (TJM2) treatment of Trifolium gracilentum
UC CalPhotos gallery: Trifolium gracilentum

gracilentum
Flora of California
Flora of Baja California
Natural history of the California chaparral and woodlands
Natural history of the California Coast Ranges
Natural history of the Channel Islands of California
Natural history of the Peninsular Ranges
Natural history of the San Francisco Bay Area
Natural history of the Transverse Ranges
Flora without expected TNC conservation status